Khunikak (also Romanized as Khūnīkak; also known as Khūnīk, Kalāteh Khūnīk, Kalāteh-ye Khūnīk, Khonik, and Khosrowābād Bālā) is a village in Arabkhaneh Rural District, Shusef District, Nehbandan County, South Khorasan Province, Iran. At the 2006 census, its population was 49, in 12 families.

References 

Populated places in Nehbandan County